Melsa Ararat is activist scholar and professor of corporate governance. She is the founder and former director of Corporate Governance Forum of Turkey (CGFT) at Sabancı University and the founding director of CDP Turkey. She is the founder and Chair of 30% Club Turkey campaign and the founding director of Business Against Domestic Violence Project (BADV).

Ararat was elected to the  board of International Corporate Governance Network (ICGN) in 2015 for a 6-year term, and to the board of United Nations Global Compact Turkey Network in 2019 for a 3-year term. She has been a Visiting Professor at the Faculty of Business and Economics in University of Groningen since 2015.

Her academic work focuses on corporate governance in emerging markets, gender diversity in corporate boards, business ethics and strategic management.

Education 
Ararat holds a BSc degree in chemical engineering, a MSc degree in thermodynamics and Phd in management and strategy.

Career and research 
Following an international career in board positions and senior management in Turkey, the Benelux, Singapore and Japan within Philips Group, Ararat joined academia in 2002 as a Professor of Practice and the Founding Director of Corporate Governance Forum of Turkey (CGFT) at Sabancı University. She supported Capital Markets Board of Turkey in developing its Corporate Governance Principles which was published in 2003. Ararat worked as an advisor to S&P’s Governance Services between 2004 and 2008. She became an associate professor of Business Ethics in 2011 and the Principal Researcher in 2017 at Sabanci University from which she retired in 2021. 

She coordinated Emerging Markets Corporate Governance Research Network of IFC from 2009 to 2017. She founded CDP’s Turkey operation in 2009, Business Against Domestic Violence Project in 2014 together with UNFPA, Independent Women Directors Platform in 2013 and 30% Club Turkey Chapter in 2017.

She was elected as a governor of International Corporate Governance Network (ICGN) in 2015 and served as a board liaison for Business Ethics and Systemic Risk Committee. She coordinated the public and private sector organizations in developing a roadmap to promote gender diversity in corporate boards between 2019 and 2021.

She also contributed to the launch of Borsa Istanbul's Sustainability Index in 2013 and Climate Index in 2021.

Selected publications 

 Ararat, M., Claessens. S. and B. Yurtoglu, “Corporate Governance in Emerging Markets: A Selective Review and an Agenda for Future Research,” in press in Emerging Markets Review.(SSCI), Online 5 Nov.2020. doi: https://doi.org/10.1016/j.ememar.2020.100768
 Ararat, Melsa (ed). (2019) Business Against Intimate Partner Violence, A case of Participative Action Research and Social Action’, Springer, Cham. doi: 10.1007/978-981-32-9652-7
 Ararat, M., Colpan, A. and D. Matten. (2018) “Business Groups and Corporate Social Responsibility for the Public Good”, Journal of Business Ethics, Vol: 153, Issue:4, pp: 911-929 doi: https://doi.org/10.1007/s10551-018-3920-4

Media 
Melsa Ararat appeared in several Bloomberg Turkey television programs and interviewed by Turkey's media outlets. She is also interviewed and quoted by international media outlets such as the Financial Times, Reuters, the Harvard Business Review and Forbes.

References

External links 
 
 home | CGFT
 Home | Business Against Domestic Violence
 Borsa Istanbul
 Independent Women Directors Project

Living people
Academic staff of Sabancı University
Turkish women academics
Year of birth missing (living people)